1913 was the 24th season of County Championship cricket in England. Kent won the title for the fourth time in eight seasons.

Honours
County Championship - Kent
Minor Counties Championship - Norfolk
Wisden - Major Booth, George Gunn, Bill Hitch, Albert Relf, Lionel Tennyson

County Championship

Leading batsmen
Phil Mead topped the averages with 2627 runs @ 50.51

Leading bowlers
Sydney Barnes topped the averages with 35 wickets @ 10.02

References

Annual reviews
 Wisden Cricketers' Almanack 1914

External links
 CricketArchive – season summaries

1913 in English cricket
English cricket seasons in the 20th century